Beibulat Musaev (born August 8, 1977) is a wrestler from Belarus, who competed in the 2000 Summer Olympics, where he placed 9th. Musaev made it to the bronze medal match of the 2001 World Wrestling Championships.

References

External links
 

Living people
Olympic wrestlers of Belarus
Wrestlers at the 2000 Summer Olympics
Belarusian male sport wrestlers
1977 births
21st-century Belarusian people
20th-century Belarusian people